Niall Breen may refer to:

 Niall Breen (racing driver) (born 1986), Irish racing driver
 Niall Breen (hurler) (born 1989), Irish hurler